Birkhadem or Bir Khadem is a commune in Algiers Province and a suburb of the city of Algiers in northern Algeria. As of the 2008 census, it had a population of 77,749.

Notable people

References

Communes of Algiers Province